Jens Martin Hagström  (born 26 May 1973) is a Swedish diplomat who was Sweden's Ambassador to Ukraine from 2016 until the end of August 2019.

Biography 
Martin Hagström was born in Stockholm.

He studied in Stockholm University and has a degree in journalism. Also he studied the Russian language, political Science and law. He speaks English, Russian and French.

Martin Hagström began his career as a journalist. His diplomatic postings include the Permanent Representation of Sweden to the European Union and the Consulate General of Sweden in Saint Petersburg. After that, he served as Head of Division for Eastern Europe at the Ministry for Foreign Affairs 2010–2013. From 2013 to 2016, Hagström served as Ambassador for the Eastern Partnership at the Ministry for Foreign Affairs of Sweden in Stockholm.
From the autumn of 2016 to 2019, Hagström served as the Swedish ambassador in Kyiv, Ukraine.

References

External links 
 Embassy of Sweden in Kyiv 
 Ambassador of Sweden to Ukraine, Facebook profile 

1973 births
Living people
Journalists from Stockholm
Stockholm University alumni
Ambassadors of Sweden to Ukraine